The Tomb of Daniel (Persian: آرامگاه دانیال نبی) is the traditional burial place of the biblical figure Daniel. Various locations have been named for the site, but the tomb in Susa, in Iran, is the most widely accepted site, it being first mentioned by Benjamin of Tudela, who visited Asia between 1160 and 1163.

Susa‌, Iran
The Book of Daniel mentions that Daniel lived in Babylon and may have visited the palace of Susa‌, Iran, but the place where he died is not specified; the tradition preserved among the Jews and Arabs is that he was buried in Susa. Today the Tomb of Daniel in Susa is a popular attraction among local Muslims and Iran's Jewish community alike.

The earliest mention of Daniel's Tomb published in Europe is given by Benjamin of Tudela who visited Asia between 1160 and 1163. In the façade of one of its many synagogues he was shown the tomb assigned by tradition to Daniel. Benjamin declares however, that the tomb does not hold Daniel's remains, which were said to have been discovered at Susa about 640 A.D. The remains were supposed to bring good fortune: and bitter quarrels arose because of them between the inhabitants of the two banks of the Choaspes River. All those living on the side on which Daniel's grave was situated were rich and happy, while those on the opposite side were poor and in want; the latter, therefore, wished the bier of Daniel transferred to their side of the river. They finally agreed that the bier should rest alternately one year on each side. This agreement was carried out for many years, until the Persian shah Sanjar, on visiting the city, stopped the practice, holding that the continual removal of the bier was disrespectful to the prophet. He ordered the bier to be fastened with chains to the bridge, directly in the middle of the structure; and he erected a chapel on the spot for both Jews and non-Jews. The king also forbade fishing in the river within a mile of Daniel's bier. According to Benjamin, the place is a dangerous one for navigation, since godless persons perish immediately on passing it; and the water under the bier is distinguished by the presence of goldfish.

Muslim traditions agree in stating that Daniel was buried at Susa, and a similar tradition was current among the Syriac writers. Al-Baladhuri (ninth century) says that when the conqueror Abu Musa al-Ash'ari came to Susa in 638, he found the coffin of Daniel, which had been brought thither from Babylon in order to bring down rain during a period of drought. Abu Musa referred the matter to the calif Umar, who ordered the coffin to be buried, which was done by sinking it to the bottom of one of the streams nearby.

A similar account is given by 10th-century Arab chronicler Ibn Hawqal who writes:

"In the city of Susa there is a river and I have heard that in the time of Abu Musa al Ashari a coffin was found there; it is said to contain the bones of Daniel the Prophet. The people held it in great veneration and in times of distress, famine or droughts brought it out and prayed for rain. Abu Mousa Al Ashoari ordered that the coffin be encased with three coverings and submerged it in the river so that it could not be viewed. The grave can be seen by anyone who dives to the bottom of the water".ed. Michael Jan de Goeje, p. 174.

Istakhri gives a similar account and adds that the Jews were accustomed to make a circuit around Daniel's tomb and to draw water in its neighborhood. Al-Muqaddasi refers to the contention between the people of Susa and those of Tustar. A slightly divergent tradition reported by Ibn Taimiyyah says that the body was found in Tustar; that at night thirteen graves were dug, and it was put in one of these—a sign according him, that the early Muslims were opposed to the worship of the tombs of holy men.

William Ouseley in Walpole's Memoirs of the East described the Tomb of Daniel in Susa as being situated in "a most beautiful spot, washed by a clear running stream and shaded by planes and other trees of ample foliage. The building is of Mahomedan date and is inhabited by a solitary Dervish, who shows the spot where the prophet is buried beneath, a small and simple square brick mausoleum, said to be (without probability) coeval with his death. It has, however, neither date nor inscription to prove the truth or falsehood of the Dervish's assertion. The small river running at the foot of this building, which is called the Bellerau, it has been said flows immediately over the prophets Tomb, and from the transparency of the water, his coffin was to be seen at the bottom; but the Dervish and the natives whom I questioned remembered no tradition corroborating such a fact; on the contrary; it has at all times been customary with the people of the country to resort hither on certain days of the months, when they offer up their prayers at the tomb I have mentioned, in supplication to the prophet's shade."

The current tomb was renovated and repaired in 1870 A.D. by order of Shia scholar Sheikh Jafar Shooshtari, the work being executed by Haj Mulla Hassan Memar. Later Mulla Hassan's son, Mulla Javad carried out further renovations in the site.

Alternative locations

Iran
Malamir
The Jewish Encyclopedia notes that a five days journey from Dezful, near Mala Amir, in Khuzestan of Iran, there is another sacred tomb said to be that of Daniel.

Iraq

Babylon
The Martyrologium Romanum of 1584 assigned  Saint Daniel's feastday  to July 21. The place of his death is given as Babylon, Mesopotamia. Though this martyrology does not say so, it was claimed that he was buried in the royal vault there.

Kirkuk
A tomb attributed to Daniel is located within the Kirkuk Citadel in the city of Kirkuk, Iraq. Originally the site was a Jewish synagogue then later it was turned into a Christian church and finally into a Muslim mosque. The mosque has arches, pillars and two domes on a decorated base and beside it there are three minarets, which belong to the end of the Mongolian reign. The mosque is about 400 square meters (5000 sq. ft.) and houses four tombs believed to belong to Daniel, Hananiah, Mishael and Azariah. As from the respect of Kirkuk people towards Prophet, they desired to bury their dead next to Daniel's Tomb. This graveyard may be regarded as the first cemetery in Kirkuk.

Mosul
A tomb attributed to the Prophet Daniel also was located in Mosul, Iraq, until it was demolished by the Islamic State of Iraq and the Levant in July 2014.

Muqdadiyah
A reference to the Tomb of Daniel being located in the village of Al Wajihiya near Muqdadiyah, Iraq, was made after a bombing at the site in 2007. The tomb, situated in the Diyala Governorate, was targeted by Islamist terrorists and most of the structure collapsed as a result, including its green dome.

Turkey
Mausoleum of Danyal in Tarsus, Mersin and also Tarsus Grand Mosque.

Uzbekistan

Samarkand
There is another claimed tomb of Daniel, located just outside Samarkand, Uzbekistan. According to the local legend, the Turkic conqueror Amir Timur attempted to conquer Syria for many years, but was unsuccessful. One of his ministers suggested it was because the saint from the biblical times, Daniel, was buried there. Timur then sent his army to where Daniel was entombed in Syria, and after a fierce fight with the Syrians, was able to take some of his remains back to Uzbekistan. It is also said that on the day Daniel was entombed a natural source of water sprung up at that spot, and it is believed by locals that its water has the power to heal.

Morocco 
The shrine of Sidi Denaine, or Daniel, is located at Jorf El-Yhoudi in Morocco. The site is popular with Jews and Muslims. The grave is eight meters long. Each year after Mawlid, a huge feast is held at the site.

See also
 Destruction of cultural heritage by ISIL

References

 Jewish Encyclopedia bibliography: Jane Dieulafoy, At Susa, p. 131, New York, 1890; Driver, The Book of Daniel, p. xxi.

Ancient Hebrew pilgrimage sites
Jewish mausoleums
Jews and Judaism in Persia and Iran
Daniel
Mausoleums in Iran
Daniel (biblical figure)
Buildings and structures in Khuzestan Province
Susa